"Oh! Mr Porter" is an old British music hall song about a girl who has got on the wrong train. It was famously part of the repertoires of the artistes Norah Blaney and  It was written in 1892 by George Le Brunn and his brother Thomas, and taken on an extended provincial tour that same year by Marie Lloyd. The lyrics include this chorus:

Birmingham is the second city of England. Crewe is a town better known as a railway junction than as a destination. The fastest route on the West Coast Main Line to Crewe and stations further north does not use the loop via Birmingham.

Cultural legacy

The song is alluded to in the 1922 novel Ulysses by James Joyce.

The title of Rose Macaulay's 1926 novel Crewe Train is a reference to the song.

The 1937 film Oh, Mr Porter! starring Will Hay was clearly at least in part inspired by the song "Oh! Mr Porter". Hay's character is called Mr William Porter; although he is not in fact a railway porter, but the stationmaster of a Northern Irish station; this leads to some confusion, typical of Hay's films. A snatch of the song can be heard over the opening credits although this version says, "I want to go to Birmingham, and they're taking me on to Crewe! Oh, Mr Porter! What a funny man you are!" 

The 1962 British film The Password is Courage includes a scene in which British prisoners of war on a German train sing "Oh, Mr Porter!" as they throw burning straw on the explosive cargo of a passing munitions train.

In 1966, the band Herman's Hermits recorded an arrangement of the song by Kenny Lynch. It consists essentially of the chorus repeated several times, but with Liverpool and Manchester as desired destinations rather than Birmingham. Liverpool was the birthplace of beat music, but this band originated from Manchester.

The song was adapted for use in the 199697 BBC television situation comedy Oh, Doctor Beeching! and sung by Su Pollard.

Dr Beeching was a chairman of British Railways, who became a household name in Britain in the early 1960s for a report which led to far-reaching reductions in the railway network.

See also
List of train songs

References 

1892 songs
Music hall songs
Songs about London
Songs about occupations
Songs about trains